David Maurice Brink  (20 July 1930, Hobart, Tasmania, Australia – 8 March 2021, Oxford, UK) was an Australian-British nuclear physicist. He is known for the Axel-Brink hypothesis.

Education and career
Brink matriculated in 1947 at the University of Tasmania, where he graduated with a B.Sc. in physics in 1951. As a Rhodes Scholar he became a graduate student in physics at Magdalen College, Oxford, where he received his PhD in 1955. His doctoral dissertation Some aspects of the interactions of light with matter was supervised by Maurice Pryce. From 1954 to 1958 Brink was a Rutherford Scholar of the Royal Society. For the academic year 1957–1958 he was an instructor at the Massachusetts Institute of Technology (MIT). From 1958 to 1993 he was a Fellow of Balliol College, Oxford. At the University of Oxford he was from 1958 to 1988 a university lecturer and from 1988 to 1993 a Moseley Reader. In 1993 he moved to Trento, Italy. There from 1993 to 1998 he was the vice-director of the European Centre for Theoretical Studies in Nuclear Physics (under the auspices of the European Centre of Technology), as well as, at the University of Trento a professor of the history of physics.

Brink was a visiting scientist at Copenhagen's Niels Bohr Institute in 1964. He has been a visiting professor at the Institut de physique nucléaire d'Orsay (1969 and 1981–1982), the University of British Columbia (1975), the Technical University of Munich (1982), the University of Trento (1988), the University of Catania (1988), and Michigan State University (1988–1989).

As a theoretical physicist he did important research on "the study of nuclear structure via the shell model and effective interactions, and nuclear reactions via statistical methods."

He was elected in 1981 a Fellow of the Royal Society. He received in 1982 the Rutherford Medal of the Institute of Physics. He was made in 1992 a Foreign Member of the Royal Society of Sciences in Uppsala. In 2006 he received the Lise Meitner Prize "for his many contributions to the theory of nuclear structure and nuclear reactions over several decades, including his seminal work on the theory of nuclear masses using Skyrme effective interactions, nuclear giant resonances, clustering in nuclei and quantum and semi-classical theories of heavy-ion scattering and reactions."

Selected publications

Articles
 
  (over 650 citations)
  (over 950 citations)
 
 
  (over 3050 citations)

Books
 with George Raymond Satchler: Angular Momentum 1962. 2nd edition 1971. 3rd edition. Clarendon Press, Oxford 1993, ISBN 0-19-851759-9
 Nuclear Forces, Pergamon Press 1965 
 German translation: Kernkräfte, WTB Texte, 1971
 Semi-classical methods in nucleus-nucleus scattering, Cambridge University Press 1985; 2009 edition 
 as editor with Feodor Karpechine, F. Bary Malik, João Da Providência: 
 with Ricardo A. Broglia: Nuclear superfluidity: pairing in finite systems, Cambridge University Press 2005; e-book ; hbk

References

1930 births
2021 deaths
20th-century Australian physicists
21st-century Australian physicists
20th-century British physicists
21st-century British physicists
University of Tasmania alumni
Alumni of Magdalen College, Oxford
Fellows of Balliol College, Oxford
Academic staff of the University of Trento
Fellows of the Royal Society
Nuclear physicists
Theoretical physicists
People from Hobart